Art Valero (born May 12, 1958) is an American football Running backs coach for the St. Louis BattleHawks of the XFL. He served as an assistant coach for the Tampa Bay Buccaneers, St. Louis Rams, Seattle Seahawks and Tennessee Titans.

Valero was officially hired by the St. Louis BattleHawks on September 13, 2022.

References

1958 births
Living people
Boise State Broncos football players
Boise State Broncos football coaches
Iowa State Cyclones football coaches
Long Beach State 49ers football coaches
New Mexico Lobos football coaches
Idaho Vandals football coaches
Utah State Aggies football coaches
Louisville Cardinals football coaches
Colorado State Rams football coaches
Tampa Bay Buccaneers coaches
St. Louis Rams coaches
Seattle Seahawks coaches
Tennessee Titans coaches
Texas Tech Red Raiders football coaches